Isaiah Robinson born in Philadelphia, Pennsylvania, was a member of the Philadelphia Ship Masters' Association and served as a lieutenant on  with Joshua Barney. He later commanded the 10-gun Continental sloop-of-war , fitted out by the Marine Committee shortly after Admiral Hopkins' fleet sailed for New Providence in 1776, and captured a six-gun British letter of marque off the Virginia Capes.

Appointed captain in the Continental Navy on 10 October 1776, he assumed command of the 14-gun brig . One of the more important smaller boats of the Continental Navy, the brig sailed under orders of the Secret Committee, dated 17 October 1776, for the Dutch island of Sint Eustatius to take on a cargo of military stores. Upon the return voyage in late November, he captured the British 12-gun sloop-of-war  after a two-hour engagement near Puerto Rico.

The following year, Captain Robinson cruised against enemy shipping off Cape May, but was finally blockaded in the Delaware River. During the defense of Philadelphia, and following the destruction of Fort Mifflin on 15 November 1777, he was forced to burn Andrew Doria to prevent the vessel from falling into enemy hands. He commanded the 12-gun Pennsylvania privateer Pomona in 1779 and succeeded in taking several British privateers. 

The date of his death is unknown, but his will, dated 12 August 1777, was probated in the city of Philadelphia on 25 September 1781.

Namesake

References

Year of birth missing
Year of death missing
Continental Navy officers
People of colonial Pennsylvania